WTVL (1490 kHz "Kool AM 1490") is a commercial AM radio station licensed to Waterville, Maine, and serving Kennebec County.  The station is owned by Townsquare Media and until January 2023, it broadcast an adult standards radio format, playing softer hits from the 1950s, 60s, 70s and 80s.  The station featured the music of Frank Sinatra, Barbra Streisand, Nat King Cole and Dionne Warwick in its playlist.

WTVL’s transmitter power output is 1,000 watts.  The transmitter is off Benton Avenue in Winslow.  The studios and offices are on Western Avenue in Augusta.

History
On June 19, 1946, WTVL first signed on as an ABC Network affiliate owned by Kennebec Broadcasting Company.  WTVL carried ABC's schedule of dramas, comedies, news, sports, soap operas, game shows and big band broadcasts during the "Golden Age of Radio."

An FM sister station went on the air March 26, 1968, at 98.3 FM, simulcasting WTVL's programming. WTVL-AM-FM had a middle of the road format and carried news from the ABC Entertainment network. In 1984, the station shifted to an adult contemporary format.

The following year, WTVL changed to a nostalgia format programmed separately from the FM station, which had moved to 98.5 FM and had become adult contemporary station WDBX. In 1987, WDBX returned to the WTVL-FM call sign, and the two stations resumed simulcasting with an oldies format.

E.H. Close, owner of WPNH AM-FM in Plymouth, New Hampshire and WKNE AM-FM in Keene, New Hampshire, bought WTVL and WTVL-FM from Kennebec Broadcasting for $1.29 million in 1988. By 1990, the stations had changed to a soft rock format. In 1993, WTVL-FM became country music station WEBB; the simulcast on WTVL continued, even though the AM call letters were not changed.

Pilot Communications bought WTVL and WEBB for $450,000 in 1994. Pilot's radio stations were acquired by Citadel Broadcasting in 1999 as part of its purchase of parent company Broadcasting Partners Holdings. In January 2003, Citadel ended WTVL's simulcast of WEBB and switched the station to an adult standards format, simulcast with sister station WEZW (1400 AM, now WJZN) in Waterville under the "Kool" branding. The call letters were changed to WODJ on November 26, 2004; on December 8, the WTVL call sign returned.

Citadel merged with Cumulus Media on September 16, 2011. Townsquare Media acquired Cumulus' Augusta/Waterville stations in 2012. The simulcast with WJZN ended on July 14, 2016, when that station changed to a classic rock format.

In January 2023 WTVL went silent.

References

External links

Adult standards radio stations in the United States
Townsquare Media radio stations
Waterville, Maine
Radio stations established in 1946
1946 establishments in Maine
TVL